Alfonso Sánchez (born 29 August 1891, date of death unknown) was a Chilean long-distance runner. He competed in the men's 5000 metres at the 1912 Summer Olympics.

References

1891 births
Year of death missing
Athletes (track and field) at the 1912 Summer Olympics
Chilean male long-distance runners
Olympic athletes of Chile
Place of birth missing